Zdenka Podkapová (born 6 August 1977) (also credited as Zdenka, Zdeňka Popová or Zdenka Novotná) is a Czech adult model, actress, and former gymnast.

Career 
In 1996, she posed for her first photoshoot, and in 1998 tried contacting Penthouse magazine. Her first pictorials for Penthouse were published in May 1998. She was chosen as Penthouse Pet of the Month. Two years later, she won Penthouse Pet of the Year in 2001.  "It was a very big surprise for me and I cried like a baby" because "I was the first girl in history from the Czech Republic to win the title as Pet of the Year and the second girl from Europe".

Personal life
Podkapová was born in Brno, Czechoslovakia (now Czech Republic).

See also
 List of Penthouse Pets of the Year

References

External links
 
 
 
 
 

1977 births
Living people
Czech female adult models
Penthouse Pets of the Year
Actors from Brno
Penthouse Pets
Czech actresses